The Sacred Fools Theater Company is a Los Angeles-based theatre company and nonprofit organization. Founded in January 1997, it's a member organization of the LA Stage Alliance.

For 18 years the company resided at 660 N. Heliotrope in The Heliotrope Theatre. In January 2016 they moved to The Broadwater Studio, a multi-theater complex at 1078 Lillian Way, Los Angeles.

Organization 
Sacred Fools is governed partly by a non-dues paying company and partly by a traditional board of directors. A three-person Artistic Committee is elected each season from by the company, and also a three-person membership committee. The board of directors oversees business matters. Sacred Fools has an open door policy and does not restrict directors to casting actors from within the company. Sacred Fools is a primarily volunteer-run organization.

The incoming Artistic Directors for Season 20 (2016-2017) are Bryan Bellomo, Danielle Ozymandias, and Alicia Conway Rock. The current Artistic Directors for Season 19 (2015-2016) are Bryan Bellomo, Paul Plunkett and Vanessa Claire Stewart.

For Season 16 (2012-2013), the Artistic Directors were Alyssa Preston, Leon Russom, and French Stewart.  For Season 17 (2013-2014), the Artistic Directors are Rebecca Larsen, Jonas Oppenheim, and Ben Rock.  For Season 18 (2014-2015), the Artistic Directors were Tifanie McQueen, Guy Picot, and Ben Rock.

History 
The Sacred Fools Theater Company was founded by John Sylvain and a group of theater artists in Sylvain's Santa Monica living room. The group very quickly formed a non-profit corporation, raised money, and found a space. They initially subleased the 660 N. Heliotrope space from Deaf West Theatre, and eventually leased the space outright.

Since its founding, Sacred Fools has produced over 100 different shows, including several World Premieres, West Coast Premieres, and Los Angeles Premieres.

Notable artists 
 Jaime Andrews
 Steven Banks
 Abraham Benrubi
 Jennifer R. Blake
 Dean Cameron
 Henry Dittman
 Richard Elfman
 Jenna Fischer
 Maile Flanagan
 Stuart Gordon
 Jon Hamm
 Brendan E. Hunt
 David Huynh
 Arthur M. Jolly
 Elaine Kao
 Carrie Keranen
 Matthew Yang King
 Phil LaMarr
 Laurie Metcalf
 Julio Perillán
 Jenelle Riley
 Ben Rock
 Leon Russom
 French Stewart
 Vanessa Claire Stewart

Notable productions 
 2G's - Directed by Scott Rabinowitz. A hip-hop version of Shakespeare's The Two Gentlemen of Verona, 2G's was nominated for 7 NAACP awards and won 2 - Best Director for Scott Rabinowitz and Best Choreography for Joe Hernandez-Kolski. The show was extended for an open-ended run at the Martini Lounge. It ran on the Sacred Fools' Mainstage from May 18-June 17, 2000 and was also chosen as L.A. Weekly's Pick of the Week.
 Absolutely Filthy (An Unauthorized Peanuts Parody) (World Premiere) - Developed by writer/actor Brendan E. Hunt as part of the late night series, "Serial Killers", this unauthorized Peanuts adaptation had a successful run in 2013, and then an additional run later that year at the Hollywood Fringe Festival, at which it won three awards, including the highest honor Top of the Fringe, as well as Best in Comedy, and Spirit of Fringe Best Performance (Male) for writer/star Brendan Hunt.  The following year, the show returned for two more runs, at South Coast Repertory and the New York International Fringe Festival.
 Bukowsical! - An original musical by Spencer Green and Gary Stockdale, with music by Stockdale, directed and choreographed by Dean Cameron. This was a splashy musical about the very unsplashy poet Charles Bukowski, with songs like "Chaser of My Heart" and "You're Stupid, Gross, and Ugly, And We Hate You." It premiered at Sacred Fools on March 17, 2006.
 Do Androids Dream of Electric Sheep? (West Coast Premiere) - A stage adaptation of the science-fiction novel by Philip K. Dick, adapted by Edward Einhorn,  made its West Coast Premiere at Sacred Fools on Sept. 13, 2013.
 Forbidden Zone: Live in the 6th Dimension (World Premiere Stage Adaptation) - Based on the musical comedy film Forbidden Zone. Performed as a live stage show with the support of actor/director/producer Richard Elfman. It premiered on Friday, May 21, 2010.
 Forever... (World Premiere Stage Adaptation) - In June 2004, Sacred Fools performed a comic adaption of Judy Blume's frequently censored book on teen sexuality, Forever..., for their Get Lit! series.
 Louis & Keely: Live at the Sahara (World Premiere) -- In 2008, Vanessa Claire Stewart and Jake Broder wrote and starred in this new musical, which went on to be nominated for four Ovation Awards, including the Franklin R. Levy Award for Musical in an Intimate Theatre, which it won.  The production went on to a second run at The Matrix Theatre Company, where Keely Smith herself attended a performance.  A greatly revised version directed by film director Taylor Hackford and still starring Stewart and Broder premiered at the Geffen Playhouse in 2009; Hackford's production was remounted in 2015 in Chicago at the Royal George Theatre, with Stewart now co-starring with Tony winner Anthony Crivello.
 Love Tapes (World Premiere) - Winner of the 2005 L.A. Weekly Award for Comedy Direction (Jessie Marion). Also nominated for Comedy Performance (Dean Cameron), Comedy Performance (Julie Mullen), Play Writing (Steven Banks and Penn Jillette). Named "Best Comedy of the Year" by Robert Axelrod of ReviewPlays.com.
 Neverwhere (West Coast Premiere) -- On April 5, 2013, Sacred Fools performed the American West Coast premiere of Robert Kauzlaric's adaptation of Neil Gaiman's urban fantasy television series and later novelization of the same name. Originally scheduled to run through May 11, it was extended an additional two weeks due to its popularity. Neil Gaiman attended a performance of the production.
 The Nigerian Spam Scam Scam (World Premiere) - This play by Dean Cameron has continued to tour around the world.
 Quiet, Please (World Premiere Stage Adaptation) - Corey Klemow directed stage adaptations of two of the best-regarded Wyllis Cooper scripts, The Thing on the Fourble Board and Whence Came You?.
 Savin’ Up For Saturday Night: The Honky-Tonk Musical (World Premiere) - Songs by Richard Levinson, book by Jeff Goode, directed by Jeremy Aldridge. This original musical premiered on September 21, 2009. It was nominated for the LA Stage Alliance’s Ovation Award for Best Music and Lyrics. Lead actor Brendan Hunt won the 2010 Ovation Award for Lead Actor in a Musical. The show is now published by Samuel French, Inc.
 Stoneface: The Rise and Fall and Rise of Buster Keaton (World Premiere) - Written by Vanessa Claire Smith and starring French Stewart. This tribute to Buster Keaton was remounted at Pasadena Playhouse in 2014.
 Voice Lessons - Nominated for four Ovation Awards including Best Play in an Intimate Theatre (Linda Toliver and Gary Guidinger in Association with Sacred Fools Theater Company), Acting Ensemble for a Play (Laurie Metcalf, French Stewart & Maile Flanagan), Lead Actor in a Play (French Stewart as Nate), and Lead Actress in a Play (Laurie Metcalf as Virginia).
 Watson: the Last Great Tale of the Legendary Sherlock Holmes (World Premiere) - Nominated for four Ovation Awards, including Best Director (Jaime Robledo), Lead Actor in a Play (Joe Fria as Sherlock Holmes), and two nominations for Featured Actor in a Play (Henry Dittman as James Moriarty and French Stewart as Freud/Queen Victoria). The play was published by Steele Spring Theatrical Licensing, and was subsequently produced at the Gretna Theatre in Pennsylvania.

References

External links 
 Official Website
 
 

Theatre companies in Los Angeles
1997 establishments in California
Performing groups established in 1997